Keith Jardine (born October 31, 1975) is an American actor and retired mixed martial artist who most notably competed in the UFC and Strikeforce.

Background
Jardine was born in Butte, Montana, moved to Oregon, and finally settled in Los Angeles, California, where he attended Canoga Park High School. Jardine played football and competed in Greco-Roman wrestling in high school under Coach Rudy Lugo, and continued to compete at Los Angeles Pierce College, then for his final two years of college as a defensive lineman at New Mexico Highlands University, which has a Division II program. He received a degree in Human Performance and Sport from New Mexico Highlands University. Before focusing on a career in mixed martial arts, Jardine worked as a personal trainer, firefighter, football coach, miner, and bounty hunter. He also played rugby and competed in high-level wrestling tournaments after college before traveling to Albuquerque, New Mexico, where he began training for MMA with Greg Jackson.

Mixed martial arts career
Jardine made his professional mixed martial arts debut in 2001, defeating Amir Rahnavardi via armbar submission. He would win five out of his next six bouts, suffering one knockout loss to Travis Wiuff six seconds into the fight, before debuting in the Japanese Pancrase organization in 2003. Jardine's bout in Pancrase, with Keiichiro Yamamiya, ended in a draw. Jardine defeated his next two opponents, including a submission win over Red Devil Sport Club fighter Arman Gambaryan, before appearing on The Ultimate Fighter 2.

The Ultimate Fighter
In 2005, Jardine was cast on The Ultimate Fighter 2, a team-based reality television show created by the UFC, as a Heavyweight competitor. He was the first Heavyweight to be chosen by team coach and then UFC Middleweight Champion Rich Franklin. Although considered a favorite to proceed to the Heavyweight division's finals, Jardine was not selected to fight until the semi-finals, where he was defeated by eventual Heavyweight winner and his future sparring partner, Rashad Evans.

Ultimate Fighting Championship
Jardine made his first appearance on an official UFC fight card at The Ultimate Fighter 2 Finale, defeating fellow TUF 2 Heavyweight Kerry Schall by TKO due to leg kicks. Jardine was signed to the UFC and subsequently dropped down a weight class to the Light Heavyweight division. His next appearance was at UFC 57 where he defeated Mike Whitehead, another The Ultimate Fighter 2 competitor, by unanimous decision.

In April 2006, Jardine fought The Ultimate Fighter 1 Light Heavyweight finalist Stephan Bonnar at Ultimate Fight Night 4. Jardine lost the fight in part due to a very controversial unanimous decision, but gained a great deal of fan and media support after the bout. After the fight Jardine stated, "Everyone knows that that Bonnar fight should have been my fight[...] I still get approached everyday about that. I am 3-1, but I don't necessarily look at it that way."

Jardine next faced American Top Team's Wilson Gouveia at The Ultimate Fighter 3 Finale. Although color commentator Joe Rogan believed that he lost the first round, Jardine managed to bounce back and defeat Gouveia via unanimous decision after three rounds. Jardine was then scheduled to fight Mike Nickels, a Light Heavyweight competitor from The Ultimate Fighter 3, but Nickels was forced to withdraw due to a back injury. Instead, he next faced The Ultimate Fighter 1 Light Heavyweight winner Forrest Griffin at UFC 66. Although considered an underdog in the bout, Jardine scored a TKO victory in the first round after he floored Forrest then took the full guard and brought many right hands over the top to cause the stoppage. At UFC 71, Jardine was scheduled to fight UFC newcomer Houston Alexander. During his pre-fight interview, Jardine complained about being matched against an unknown newcomer, believing that he deserved an opponent with a higher profile. During the fight, Jardine quickly knocked Alexander down with a punch, but the newcomer promptly returned to his feet and knocked Jardine out just 48 seconds into the first round in a major upset.

Jardine was then matched up against former long-time UFC Light Heavyweight Champion, Chuck Liddell at UFC 76. The bout was Liddell's first fight since losing his belt to Quinton Jackson. Jardine landed numerous unchecked leg kicks and several body kicks to Liddell's side throughout the fight, which was spent almost totally on the feet. The bout was ruled a split decision in Jardine's favor, turning him into a top contender for the UFC Light Heavyweight Championship. First, however, Jardine faced former PRIDE Middleweight Champion Wanderlei Silva. Silva swarmed Jardine with punches and knocked him out just 36 seconds into the first round. Jardine had to be helped up after the fight and was sent to the local hospital for observation.

After this loss, Jardine faced Brandon Vera at UFC 89. Although it appeared that Vera damaged Jardine's knee with a front kick in the second round, Jardine ultimately earned a split decision victory over Vera. In a post-fight interview, Jardine stated that the injury was minor. With the victory, Jardine earned a shot at Quinton Jackson at UFC 96. Although the fight was considered an elimination bout for title contention, Jardine and former UFC Light Heavyweight Champion Rashad Evans are close friends and training partners and both have stated that they will not fight each other. In a close fight, Jardine lost by unanimous decision. The bout was the Fight of the Night earning them a $60,000 bonus. Jardine was the last man to fight Jackson before his temporary retirement.

Jardine was knocked out by Thiago Silva at UFC 102 1:35 in the first round.

Jardine suffered his second consecutive knockout and third straight loss at the hands of Ryan Bader on February 21, 2010, at UFC 110. After being rocked by a straight right from Bader, he received a flying knee to the ribs and then a hook punch to the chin that knocked him out, two minutes into the third round.

Jardine faced Matt Hamill on June 19, 2010, at The Ultimate Fighter: Team Liddell vs. Team Ortiz Finale. He lost the fight via majority decision, in a bout that earned Fight of the Night honors. Subsequently, he was released by the UFC on June 24, 2010.

Independent promotions
Jardine's first fight since leaving the UFC was against Shark Fights Light Heavyweight Champion Trevor Prangley in a non-title bout at Shark Fights 13: Jardine vs. Prangley on September 11, 2010. Jardine lost to Prangley via split decision, bringing his losing streak to five-in-a-row. After the fight he was given an indefinite suspension by the Texas Department of Licensing and Regulation for shoving referee Steve Armstrong prior to the fight.

Jardine was scheduled to face Francisco France at Nemesis Fighting: MMA Global Invasion on November 13, 2010, but the event was postponed to avoid a storm. The new date for the event was December 10, 2010.

Jardine defeated Francisco via unanimous decision and snapped his five fight losing streak. The win at Nemesis was surrounded by controversy, as there were no judges at the event. Jardine and other fighters on the card were also never paid by the promotion.

Jardine next took on MFC veteran Aron Lofton in an event near Albuquerque, New Mexico. Jardine was victorious via TKO (punches) at 3:30 of the first round.

Strikeforce
Jardine signed with Strikeforce as a late replacement for the injured Mike Kyle to face Gegard Mousasi on the April 9th card in San Diego. The hard-fought fight ultimately ended in a majority draw due to Mousasi being docked one point in the first round for an illegal upkick. Strikeforce CEO Scott Coker has stated a rematch may be in the cards in the near future.

Jardine stated that after his fight with Mousasi, he will drop down to the Middleweight division and that he wants to fight former Strikeforce Middleweight Champion Cung Le.

Jardine faced Luke Rockhold for the Strikeforce Middleweight Championship at Strikeforce: Rockhold vs. Jardine on January 7, 2012. He lost the fight via TKO in the first round.

Jardine next faced Roger Gracie at Strikeforce: Rockhold vs. Kennedy on July 14 and lost via unanimous decision after being cut open in the first round by an elbow from mount by Gracie.

In an interview with MMA Fight Corner, Jardine described himself as "semi-retired" and is unsure if he will return to the cage.

Boxing
Jardine has fought four bouts as a professional boxer. His professional boxing record is three wins with one draw. His last boxing bout was a draw against Jason Cordova that took place on August 20, 2004.

Acting career
In 2009, Jardine appeared in the movies Crank: High Voltage (starring Jason Statham) and Gamer (starring Gerard Butler). He was also featured in the Breaking Bad (starring fellow Canoga Park High School Alumnus Bryan Cranston) Season 3 episode "I.F.T", where he played a criminal who gets into a bar fight. He has appeared in small roles in various other films such as Tactical Force, Beer For My Horses, Unrivaled and Death Warrior. On February 11, 2013, he starred in the Hawaii Five-O episode titled, Kekoa. In 2014, he appeared in the movies John Wick, Inherent Vice and Shot Caller. In 2016, he appears in Preacher, playing one of Odin's employees, named Verne. He makes a brief appearance in the Bruce Willis film Once Upon a Time in Venice. Jardine played Dyer Howe, a member of Frank Griffin's gang, in the Netflix series Godless, released in November 2017, appearing in the film Bird Box, released in December 2018, and appearing in Season 2, episode 5 of the series The Punisher.

He portrays Pete in Vincent D'Onofrio 2019 film The Kid.

Personal life
Jardine is currently engaged to MMA Women's Atomweight fighter Jodie Esquibel, who was a contestant on The Ultimate Fighter: Team Joanna vs. Team Cláudia.
In 2014 Jardine featured on a social media video that went viral where he proceeded to track down a thief and make a citizen's arrest.

Championships and accomplishments
 Ultimate Fighting Championship
 Fight of the Night (Two times) vs. Quinton Jackson, Matt Hamill 
 Knockout of the Night (One time) vs. Forrest Griffin

Mixed martial arts record

|-
| Loss
| align=center| 17–11–2
| Roger Gracie
| Decision (unanimous)
| Strikeforce: Rockhold vs. Kennedy
| 
| align=center| 3
| align=center| 5:00
| Portland, Oregon, United States
| 
|-
| Loss
| align=center| 
| Luke Rockhold
| TKO (punches)
| Strikeforce: Rockhold vs. Jardine
| 
| align=center| 1   
| align=center| 4:26
| Las Vegas, Nevada, United States
| 
|-
| Draw
| align=center| 17–9–2
| Gegard Mousasi
| Draw (majority)
| Strikeforce: Diaz vs. Daley
| 
| align=center| 3
| align=center| 5:00
| San Diego, California, United States
| 
|-
| Win
| align=center| 17–9–1
| Aron Lofton
| TKO (punches)
| Fresquez Productions
| 
| align=center| 1
| align=center| 3:30
| Albuquerque, New Mexico, United States
| 
|-
| Win
| align=center| 16–9–1
| Francisco France
| Decision (unanimous)
| Nemesis Fighting: MMA Global Invasion
| 
| align=center| 3
| align=center| 5:00
| Punta Cana, Dominican Republic
| 
|-
| Loss
| align=center| 15–9–1
| Trevor Prangley
| Decision (split)
| Shark Fights 13: Jardine vs Prangley
| 
| align=center| 3
| align=center| 5:00
| Amarillo, Texas, United States
|
|-
| Loss
| align=center| 15–8–1
| Matt Hamill
| Decision (majority)
| The Ultimate Fighter: Team Liddell vs. Team Ortiz Finale
| 
| align=center| 3
| align=center| 5:00
| Las Vegas, Nevada, United States
| 
|-
| Loss
| align=center| 15–7–1
| Ryan Bader
| KO (punch)
| UFC 110
| 
| align=center| 3
| align=center| 2:10
| Sydney, Australia
| 
|-
| Loss
| align=center| 15–6–1
| Thiago Silva
| TKO (punches)
| UFC 102
| 
| align=center| 1
| align=center| 1:35
| Portland, Oregon, United States
| 
|-
| Loss
| align=center| 15–5–1
| Quinton Jackson
| Decision (unanimous)
| UFC 96
| 
| align=center| 3
| align=center| 5:00
| Columbus, Ohio, United States
| 
|-
| Win
| align=center| 15–4–1
| Brandon Vera
| Decision (split)
| UFC 89
| 
| align=center| 3
| align=center| 5:00
| Birmingham, England
| 
|-
| Loss
| align=center| 14–4–1
| Wanderlei Silva
| KO (punches)
| UFC 84
| 
| align=center| 1
| align=center| 0:36
| Las Vegas, Nevada, United States
| 
|-
| Win
| align=center| 14–3–1
| Chuck Liddell
| Decision (split)
| UFC 76
| 
| align=center| 3
| align=center| 5:00
| Anaheim, California, United States
| 
|-
| Loss
| align=center| 13–3–1
| Houston Alexander
| KO (punches)
| UFC 71
| 
| align=center| 1
| align=center| 0:48
| Las Vegas, Nevada, United States
| 
|-
| Win
| align=center| 13–2–1
| Forrest Griffin
| TKO (punches)
| UFC 66: Liddell vs. Ortiz
| 
| align=center| 1
| align=center| 4:41
| Las Vegas, Nevada, United States
|  Knockout of the Night.
|-
| Win
| align=center| 12–2–1
| Wilson Gouveia
| Decision (unanimous)
| The Ultimate Fighter: Team Ortiz vs. Team Shamrock Finale
| 
| align=center| 3
| align=center| 5:00
| Las Vegas, Nevada, United States
| 
|-
| Loss
| align=center| 11–2–1
| Stephan Bonnar
| Decision (unanimous)
| UFC Fight Night 4
| 
| align=center| 3
| align=center| 5:00
| Las Vegas, Nevada, United States
| 
|-
| Win
| align=center| 11–1–1
| Mike Whitehead
| Decision (unanimous)
| UFC 57: Liddell vs. Couture 3
| 
| align=center| 3
| align=center| 5:00
| Las Vegas, Nevada, United States
|Light Heavyweight debut.
|-
| Win
| align=center| 10–1–1
| Kerry Schall
| TKO (leg kicks)
| The Ultimate Fighter 2 Finale
| 
| align=center| 2
| align=center| 3:28
| Las Vegas, Nevada, United States
| 
|-
| Win
| align=center| 9–1–1
| Arman Gambaryan
| Submission (armbar)
| M-1 MFC: Heavyweight GP
| 
| align=center| 1
| align=center| 2:37
| Moscow, Russia
| 
|-
| Win
| align=center| 8–1–1
| Tom Elrite
| KO (punches)
| Independent Event
| 
| align=center| 1
| align=center| 2:50
| New Mexico, United States
| 
|-
| Win
| align=center| 7–1–1
| Brian Bair
| TKO (punches)
| Venom: First Strike
| 
| align=center| 1
| align=center| 2:02
| Huntington Beach, California, United States
| 
|-
| Draw
| align=center| 6–1–1
| Keiichiro Yamamiya
| Draw (unanimous)
| Pancrase - Hybrid 8
| 
| align=center| 2
| align=center| 5:00
| Osaka, Japan
| 
|-
| Win
| align=center| 6–1
| George Allen
| Decision (unanimous)
| KOTC 24: Mayhem
| 
| align=center| 2
| align=center| 5:00
| Albuquerque, New Mexico, United States
| 
|-
| Win
| align=center| 5–1
| Allan Sullivan
| TKO (punches)
| KOTC 21: Invasion
| 
| align=center| 2
| align=center| 1:56
| Albuquerque, New Mexico, United States
| 
|-
| Win
| align=center| 4–1
| Bryan Pardoe
| KO (punches)
| KOTC 20 - Crossroads
| 
| align=center| 1
| align=center| 1:09
| Bernalillo, New Mexico, United States
| 
|-
| Win
| align=center| 3–1
| Philip Preece
| Decision (unanimous)
| KOTC 14 - 5150
| 
| align=center| 2
| align=center| 5:00
| Bernalillo, New Mexico, United States
| 
|-
| Loss
| align=center| 2–1
| Travis Wiuff
| KO (punch)
| EC 46
| 
| align=center| 1
| align=center| 0:06
| Clive, Iowa, United States
| 
|-
| Win
| align=center| 2–0
| Abe Andujo
| TKO (punches)
| Rage in the Cage 31
| 
| align=center| 1
| align=center| 1:20
| Phoenix, Arizona, United States
| 
|-
| Win
| align=center| 1–0
| Amir Rahnavardi
| Submission (armbar)
| GC 5
| 
| align=center| 1
| align=center| 2:44
| Denver, Colorado, United States
|

Professional boxing record

{|class="wikitable" style="text-align:center; font-size:95%"
|-
!
!Result
!Record
!Opponent
!Method
!Round, time
!Date
!Location
!Notes
|-
|4
|Draw
|3–0–1
|style="text-align:left;"| Jason Cordova
|PTS
|6
|Aug 20, 2004
|style="text-align:left;"| 
|style="text-align:left;"|
|-
|3
|Win
|3–0
|style="text-align:left;"| Augustine Trujillo
|MD
|4
|Jun 27, 2004
|style="text-align:left;"| 
|style="text-align:left;"|
|-
|2
|Win
|2–0
|style="text-align:left;"| Che Velarde
|UD
|4
|May 5, 2004
|style="text-align:left;"| 
|style="text-align:left;"|
|-
|1
|Win
|1–0
|style="text-align:left;"| Jose Beltran
|TKO
|2 (4)
|Dec 12, 2003
|style="text-align:left;"| 
|style="text-align:left;"|

See also
 List of Strikeforce alumni
 List of mixed martial artists with professional boxing records
 List of male mixed martial artists

References

External links

 
 
 

1975 births
American male mixed martial artists
Mixed martial artists from New Mexico
Light heavyweight mixed martial artists
Mixed martial artists utilizing collegiate wrestling
Mixed martial artists utilizing Greco-Roman wrestling
Mixed martial artists utilizing boxing
Mixed martial artists utilizing Gaidojutsu
Living people
Sportspeople from Albuquerque, New Mexico
Sportspeople from Butte, Montana
Ultimate Fighting Championship male fighters
American male sport wrestlers
American male boxers